Jalen Jelks (born August 3, 1996) is an American football defensive end who is currently a free agent. He played college football at Oregon.

Early years
Jelks attended Desert Vista High School. He played football in only 3 years. As a senior, he was a two-way starter at defensive line and left tackle. He registered 72 tackles (12 for loss), 10 sacks, 3 forced fumbles and one blocked field goal, while receiving All-state honors.

He finished his high school career with 113 tackles (17 for loss), 15 sacks, 4 forced fumbles and 3 fumble recoveries. A 3-star recruit, Jelks committed to play football at Oregon over offers from Arizona State, California, Nebraska, Tennessee, Utah, Washington, and Wisconsin, among others.

College career
Jelks accepted a football scholarship from the University of Oregon. After redshirting for a year, he appeared in 11 games as a backup defensive end, collecting 9 tackles (6 in the final three games) and 3 sacks as a freshman. As a sophomore in a reserve role, he contributed with 31 tackles (4 for loss), 2 sacks and 2 pass breakups in 8 games. 

As a junior, he started all 13 games, recording 59 tackles 6.5 sacks (led the team), 15 tackles for loss (led the team) and 7 pass breakups. He had 9 tackles in the 2017 Las Vegas Bowl. He was put on the watchlist for the Chuck Bednarik Award during the season. He was named to the All-Pac-12 second-team, Pro Football Focus first-team All-Pac-12 and the Phil Steele second-team All-Pac-12 Conference.

Despite speculation that he could declare for the 2018 NFL Draft, Jelks announced that he would return to Oregon. As a senior in 12 starts, he registered 57 tackles (7.5 for loss) and 3.5 sacks.

Professional career

Dallas Cowboys
Jelks was selected by the Dallas Cowboys in the seventh round (241st overall) of the 2019 NFL Draft. He was placed on the injured reserve list on August 30. On August 16, 2020, he was released to make room for the signing of free agent defensive end Everson Griffen.

Carolina Panthers
On August 17, 2020, Jelks was claimed off waivers by the Carolina Panthers. He was waived on September 5.

Cleveland Browns
Jelks was signed to the Cleveland Browns' practice squad on September 22, 2020. He was released on October 26.

Washington Football Team
On November 16, 2020, Jelks signed to the practice squad of the Washington Football Team. He signed a reserve/futures contract on January 11, 2021. Jelks was waived by Washington with a injury designation on July 27, 2021, and reverted to injured reserve after clearing waivers. He wasn't re-signed after the season.

References

External links

Oregon Ducks bio

1996 births
Living people
Players of American football from Phoenix, Arizona
American football defensive ends
Oregon Ducks football players
Dallas Cowboys players
Carolina Panthers players
Cleveland Browns players
Washington Football Team players